Malcolm Mitchell (London, 9 November 1926-Bognor Regis, 9 March 1998) was an English jazz guitarist and bandleader. His Mitchell Trio, with pianist Johnny Pearson and Teddy Broughton on bass, became well known supporting US jazzmen and singers touring in the UK but caught by the powerful local Musicians' Union ban on non-union foreign musicians. The Mitchell Trio played with acts including Duke Ellington, Hoagy Carmichael and the singer Maxine Sullivan.

Recordings
Debut, album 1955

References

1926 births
1998 deaths
English guitarists
English jazz musicians